is a publishing imprint affiliated with the Japanese publishing company ASCII Media Works (formerly MediaWorks). It was established in June 1993 with the publication of Hyōryū Densetsu Crystania volume one, and is a light novel imprint aimed at a male audience. The editors in charge of this imprint have a reputation for welcoming new authors, and hold a yearly contest, the Dengeki Novel Prize, to discover new talent. The eighth volume of Kino's Journey, originally published in October 2004, was Dengeki Bunko's 1,000th published novel. As of September 2010, Dengeki Bunko has published over 2,000 light novels; the 2,000th novel was volume one of Yuyuko Takemiya's Golden Time. Several publications from Dengeki Bunko were later adapted into anime series, including  Kino's Journey, Shakugan no Shana, A Certain Magical Index and Sword Art Online among others. After MediaWorks' light novel magazine Dengeki hp was discontinued, a new magazine entitled Dengeki Bunko Magazine succeeded it. In April 2013, the imprint celebrated their 20th anniversary with an exhibition.

Published titles

!–9

A

B

C

D

E

F

G

H

I

J

K

L

M

N

O

P

Q

R

S

T

U

V

W

Y

Z

References

External links

 

 
Book publishing company imprints
Kadokawa Dwango franchises
Publishing companies established in 1993